Sven-Göran Eriksson (born 5 February 1948) is a Swedish football manager and former player.

After an unassuming playing career as a right-back, Eriksson went on to experience major success in club management between 1977 and 2001, winning 18 trophies with a variety of league clubs in Sweden, Portugal and Italy; he became the first manager to win league-and-cup doubles in three countries. In European competition, he won both the UEFA Cup and the European Cup Winners' Cup (the last edition of the latter trophy before its abolition) and reached the final of the European Cup.

Eriksson later managed the national teams of England, Mexico, Philippines and the Ivory Coast, as well as two clubs in England. Eriksson has coached in ten countries: Sweden, Portugal, Italy, England, Mexico, Ivory Coast, Thailand, the United Arab Emirates, China, and the Philippines.

Early life
Eriksson was born in Sunne and raised in Torsby, both in Värmland. His father, also named Sven, was a bus conductor, and his mother, Ulla, worked in a textile store. He was nicknamed "Svennis" after his younger brother Lars-Erik's attempt to pronounce his name; Eriksson went on to become known, and is generally referred to in Sweden mononymously, by this nickname.

Playing career
Eriksson made his debut for Swedish football Division 4 team Torsby IF at the age of 16. He switched clubs to SK Sifhälla after moving to Säffle to study economics. In 1972, he joined Swedish football Division 2 team KB Karlskoga FF, where he also worked as a physical education teacher in Örebro.

He was heavily influenced by Karlskoga's player-manager, Tord Grip, who favoured the English style of play that Bob Houghton and Roy Hodgson had brought to the country. Eriksson retired from playing in 1975 at the age of 27, after giving up on his dream of playing professional football; he summed up his brief playing career by saying "I was looked upon as a distinctly average defender, but someone who rarely made mistakes".

Management career

Degerfors IF
Having retired as a player, Eriksson received an offer to become Tord Grip's assistant at Degerfors. A year later, Grip was appointed assistant manager of the Sweden national team, and Eriksson became Degerfors' manager. His stint as manager lasted from 1 January 1977 to 31 December 1978. He led the team to the playoffs in 1977 and 1978, winning the latter and promotion to Swedish Football Division 2.

IFK Göteborg
His success with assistant manager Tom Chadney by his side attracted the attention of much larger clubs, and Eriksson was appointed manager of IFK Göteborg on 1 January 1979. The move was such a surprise that many of the players had never even heard of him.

They finished second in the Allsvenskan and won the Svenska Cupen for the first time in the club's history, defeating Åtvidabergs FF 6–1 in the final. Although results had improved, the team's style did not make him popular. He put results ahead of flair, emphasised tactical awareness and work rate, and he reined in the team's old cavalier style.

As a consequence, the average attendance fell by 3,000 to 13,320. Like Grip, he was influenced by Houghton and Hodgson and played a 4–4–2 with zonal marking and heavy pressing. Göteborg finished third in the 1980 season and second again in 1981. The following season, they won the treble. The team won the League and subsequent playoff, the Svenska Cupen, defeating Östers IF 3–2 in the final.

Eriksson's international breakthrough came during the spring of 1982, when he led IFK Göteborg to the first ever UEFA Cup for a Swedish club, defeating Valencia in the quarter finals and 1. FC Kaiserslautern in the semi-finals. Awaiting them in the finals was Hamburger SV.

At Ullevi stadium in Gothenburg, Göteborg managed to score a late deciding goal, and took a 1–0 score with them to the away fixture, which they won 3–0, and with it, the 1981–82 UEFA Cup by an aggregate score of 4–0. His club's success sparked interest in his skills from other clubs, leading him to leave IFK Göteborg in August 1982.

Benfica
Eriksson's European success led to him being recruited by Portuguese club Benfica, which he joined on 1 September 1982. Eriksson's influence was immediate, winning the Primeira Divisão, the Taça de Portugal and finishing runners-up in the 1982–83 UEFA Cup to Anderlecht. After winning a second consecutive league title, Eriksson then moved on to Italy, becoming manager of Roma.

Roma
Eriksson joined Roma on 1 July 1984. He was not as immediately successful at the Giallorossi as he had been before, but nonetheless still won a Coppa Italia with the club in 1986. Eriksson left the club on 6 May 1987.

Fiorentina and return to Benfica
Eriksson was manager of Fiorentina from 1 July 1987. Eriksson's stint with the club was trophyless, and he moved back to Benfica for a second stint in 1989. Eriksson led the Portuguese side to the final of the 1989–90 European Cup (losing to Milan 1–0) in 1990, and another Primeira Divisão title in 1991. Eriksson left the club in June 1992.

Sampdoria
In July 1992, Eriksson returned to Italy to lead Sampdoria, where he managed to win another Coppa Italia in 1994. In contrast to his predecessor, Vujadin Boškov, he introduced a defensive system which was based on zonal marking rather than man-marking. He left in June 1997.

Lazio
In December 1996, Eriksson agreed to leave Sampdoria at the end of the season, to manage Blackburn Rovers. In February 1997, however, he went back on his word, and opted to stay in Italy and become the new manager at Lazio, effective 1 July 1997. Eriksson stated family reasons for wanting to stay in Italy, and Rovers would go on to appoint Roy Hodgson.

Eriksson employed fellow Swede Tord Grip as his assistant. Eriksson finally found major success in Italy with Lazio when he won the Coppa Italia and the Italian Supercup in 1998 and 2000, the European Cup Winners' Cup (1999, the final tournament), and the Serie A title (the Scudetto) in 2000 – only the second time that the Roman club had won the Italian championship in their history.

England national football team

Following the resignation of England manager Kevin Keegan after a home loss to Germany in October 2000, The Football Association (FA) pursued Eriksson as his replacement. Eriksson had initially agreed to take over after the expiration of his contract in June 2001, but decided to resign his post early at Lazio, and he officially began his England duties in January of that year. Eriksson was the first non-British manager to be appointed coach of the England national football team.

2002 World Cup
Eriksson turned around England's bid for qualification for the 2002 World Cup, with several crucial wins over lesser opposition, before his first real test – England's rematch with Germany in Munich on 1 September 2001. England defeated their long-time rivals 5–1. Despite this, England still needed a late equaliser at home to Greece to qualify automatically.

At the finals, England drew with Sweden, defeated their other longtime rivals Argentina 1–0, and drew with Nigeria to qualify in second place from the four-team group. They went on to defeat Denmark 3–0 in the Round of 16, before losing 2–1 to ten-man Brazil, who went on to win the tournament.

UEFA Euro 2004
After winning their first qualifying match in Slovakia, England drew at home with North Macedonia and were then booed off by their fans after losing a friendly to Australia. England, however, won their next five qualifiers and, needing a point from the last game to qualify, drew 0–0 in Turkey to top the group.

In their first match in the finals, England were winning 1–0 against France after 90 minutes, but lost after Zinedine Zidane scored twice in injury time. A 3–0 victory over Switzerland and a 4–2 victory over Croatia, however, meant England still qualified for a quarter-final against the hosts Portugal. There, Michael Owen gave England an early lead only for Hélder Postiga to equalize. England then had a Sol Campbell goal disallowed before ultimately losing on penalties.

2006 World Cup
Regardless of the antipathy to Eriksson expressed by some in the English media, the England team professed total confidence in him, and in July 2004, threatened to strike during a media-driven campaign to oust him. The FA renewed and extended Eriksson's contract by two further years to include UEFA Euro 2008. On 7 September 2005, Eriksson's England team lost a World Cup qualifying match against Northern Ireland 1–0, the first time that England had lost to that team since 1972, and one of only five competitive games lost during Eriksson's tenure.

Although it was England's first-ever defeat in a World Cup or European Championship qualifying match under Eriksson, it brought his position under pressure and he was criticized, both by some fans and by commentators from the BBC, for his alleged lack of charisma and tactical awareness. Criticism continued as England scraped a 1–0 victory over Austria, in a game which saw David Beckham controversially sent off. Some of the criticism from within the media was answered however, as England put in a much improved performance, despite the absence of Beckham through suspension and Sol Campbell and Steven Gerrard through injury, in a 2–1 win against Poland.

In January 2006, Eriksson was recorded saying he would be willing to leave England to manage Aston Villa if England won the World Cup, after being duped into believing that a wealthy Arab would buy the club, and wanted him as manager. The wealthy "Arab" was in fact the "Fake Sheikh" Mazher Mahmood, an undercover News of the World reporter.

On 23 January, The FA announced that Eriksson would leave his job after the 2006 World Cup, and it was thought that the News of the World allegations played a part in this decision. This was later denied by both parties, with Eriksson explaining that there was a prior arrangement to terminate his contract immediately after the World Cup.

In March 2006, The Guardian reported that South Africa became the first potential employer publicly to register its interest in Eriksson. That job, however, went to Carlos Alberto Parreira.

The tournament
England finished top of Group B at the finals, beating Paraguay and Trinidad and Tobago, before a 2–2 draw with Sweden, although the English press considered their performances far from satisfactory.

In the second round, a David Beckham trademark free kick was enough to see Eriksson's England past Ecuador in a lacklustre 1–0 encounter affected by very high temperatures. Eriksson, however, once again fell to nemesis Luiz Felipe Scolari's Portugal. They defeated England 3–1 on penalties with the score 0–0 after extra time, with Beckham lost to injury and Wayne Rooney sent off for stamping on Ricardo Carvalho. The result was Eriksson's third successive exit in a major tournament quarter-final. In his farewell speech, Eriksson wished England well and singled out Rooney for special praise, advising the press not to blame the youngster's dismissal for England's exit.

Eriksson improved England's FIFA World Rankings place from seventeenth place in January 2001 to fifth in July 2006, reaching fourth during the 2006 World Cup, and was rated by The FA as England's second most successful manager after Alf Ramsey. Under Eriksson, England achieved the highest point percentage in major tournament matches of all time for an England manager, losing only three competitive games (excluding extra time) and achieved top qualifying place in all three international tournaments.

In July 2006, after his final match with England, ESPN FC reported he had turned down the chance to manage Jamaica, as well as an unknown participating club in the UEFA Champions League. In October 2006, it was rumoured he was in talks to manage Newcastle, in which his agent denied.

Manchester City
In July 2007, virtually a year to the day that he left the England job, Eriksson was confirmed as the new manager of Manchester City after signing a three-year contract worth £2 million per year, plus bonuses. He was City's first manager from outside the United Kingdom and the first Swedish manager in the Premier League. Before the season started, he signed striker Rolando Bianchi, along with midfielders Gélson Fernandes, Geovanni, Martin Petrov and Elano; and defenders Vedran Ćorluka and Javier Garrido.

On 19 August, Manchester City beat reigning Premier League champions Manchester United to go top of the 2007–08 Premier League after three games without conceding a goal. Eriksson received the Premier League's Manager of the Month award for August. The club stayed in the top six throughout the rest of 2007, and were third throughout October and November, but fell to seventh on 12 January 2008 after winning only one of their previous five games.

In Spring 2008, owner Thaksin Shinawatra said that he would replace Eriksson after only one full season due to an "avalanche of very poor results which is unacceptable at this level". In the last game of the season, Manchester City suffered an 8–1 loss to Middlesbrough, the biggest defeat of Eriksson's career. Some concluded that the team had "gone on strike" as a symbolic protest during the game, although a red card for Richard Dunne after 15 minutes made the game difficult for City.

Manchester City ended in ninth place in the league, one place away from the UEFA Cup 2008–09 qualifying positions. Manchester City subsequently qualified through the extra place awarded to the Premier League for finishing as the highest placed team who had not already qualified for a European competition in the UEFA Fair Play League for 2007–08. Eriksson became the first Manchester City manager since 1969–70 to win both league derby games against Manchester United and also achieved the club's joint highest Premier League point total, 55.

On 2 June 2008, Manchester City confirmed by club statement that they had parted company with Eriksson by "mutual consent", with Eriksson still having two years left on his contract. Following news of his departure, the City supporters' groups organised a petition with around 14,000 signatures which was handed to the club.

Mexico national team
On 3 June 2008, Eriksson was officially signed to become manager of the Mexico national team. He formally started the role after Mexico's World Cup qualifier against Belize on 21 June. On 20 August 2008, he debuted as manager of Mexico in a CONCACAF World Cup qualifier versus Honduras. Mexico went on to win 2–1. On the next matches some results were poor, as Mexico tied with Canada and lost to Jamaica and Honduras.

On 11 February 2009, Eriksson was put under further pressure as his side lost 2–0 to the United States. Calls for him to quit or be sacked were heard from the fans while English club Portsmouth were rumoured to be interested in making him their new manager. This link was strengthened by reports of members from the Portsmouth board flying to Mexico City to discuss contract offers with Eriksson and a possible compensation settlement with the Mexican Football Federation.

On 3 March 2009, Eriksson continued to deny that he would leave Mexico and return to manage Portsmouth, insisting that he would remain and help Mexico qualify for the World Cup. After a 3–1 World Cup qualifying loss at Honduras, Eriksson was removed as national team coach. Eriksson had only won one of his last seven non-friendly games as manager.

Notts County
On 22 July 2009, Eriksson was appointed as director of football at English League Two team Notts County, following that club's takeover by Middle East consortium Munto Finance with Eriksson getting a reported, but unconfirmed, £2 million per year deal. It is believed his contract was based on the future success of the club with a large percentage share holding making up his contract.

Eriksson later said that he was attracted by the consortium's plans to take the world's oldest league club to the top of the Premier League, and believed that they had the finance and commitment to do that. Large-scale investment in new facilities were promised, and Sol Campbell and Kasper Schmeichel joined the club from Premier League teams. Campbell, however, played only one game before departing and Schmeichel was released at the end of the season.

County's large debts, including an unpaid tax bill, emerged in November 2009. On 11 February 2010, Eriksson resigned as director of football following the club's takeover by former Lincoln City chairman Ray Trew. Eriksson waived a multi-million payoff in order to assist the takeover, which chairman Trew described as the act of an "absolute gentleman". Notts County were promoted as League Two champions at the end of the season.

Ivory Coast national team 
On 28 March 2010, Eriksson became the manager of the Ivory Coast national team. Disclosure of the amount of money Eriksson's contract was worth has never been confirmed, but it has been reported that he received £270,000 for accepting the job. On 15 June, Ivory Coast played a 0–0 draw against Portugal in their opening game in Group G of the 2010 World Cup finals, followed by a 3–1 loss against Brazil on 20 June.

Despite defeating North Korea in the final group game 3–0, Ivory Coast failed to qualify for the knockout stages. Prior to the match against Brazil, Brazilian coach Dunga commented, "With Eriksson, Ivory Coast has great balance. We used to see them play and they didn't have this type of organisation that they have now."

As there were no reported negotiations of an extension to Eriksson's contract between his agent and the Ivorian Football Federation, his contract ended on 25 June.

Leicester City
Eriksson was appointed manager of Leicester City on 3 October 2010, as the Foxes sat in the relegation zone of the Championship. His first league game in charge resulted in a 1–1 draw against Hull City, managed by Nigel Pearson who had managed Leicester for the previous two seasons. This was quickly followed by Leicester's first victory under Eriksson, beating Leeds United 2–1 at Elland Road.

In December 2010, it was announced that Eriksson denied talks into becoming the new manager for Blackburn Rovers, following the exit of Sam Allardyce, stating he was happy managing Leicester.

Boosted by the loan signings of players such as Kyle Naughton and later Yakubu, results steadily improved under Eriksson as Leicester gradually began to climb the table, until a good run of form in the new year saw Leicester win seven of their first eight league games of 2011, and also take Premier League title challengers and eventual cup winners Manchester City to a replay in the FA Cup.

On 18 February 2011, after an injury time winner from Martyn Waghorn at home to Bristol City, Leicester had climbed to seventh in the table, and just one point off a play-off place. Leicester's form, however, began to stutter as they won just two out of their following eleven games. The Foxes ended up finishing the season in 10th position.

Eriksson spent big in a bid for promotion in the summer of 2011, including multimillion-pound transfer fees on Matt Mills and Jermaine Beckford. making them pre season promotion favourites. After thirteen league matches, however, Eriksson left the club by mutual consent on 25 October 2011, with the Foxes sitting in the thirteenth position in the league, two points from a play-off position.

Three players who were signed by Eriksson – Kasper Schmeichel, David Nugent and Paul Konchesky – were part of the Leicester team that won the 2013–14 Championship and survived relegation from the 2014–15 Premier League under Nigel Pearson. Nugent credited Eriksson for his improved form at the club. Of the three, Schmeichel was a key member of the first team that won the 2015–16 Premier League.

Management period
In an interview with Yorkshire Radio on 8 February 2012, the chairman of Football League Championship club Leeds United, Ken Bates, revealed that Eriksson had applied for the vacant managerial position at the club after the dismissal of Simon Grayson. Bates went on to state that his application was unsuccessful. On 3 September 2012, Eriksson was unveiled as the technical director of BEC Tero Sasana, a team in the Thai Premier League.

On 17 November 2012, Norwegian media reported that Eriksson was in talks with Vålerenga, about the possibility of taking over the soon to be available manager job for the Oslo-based club. A meeting between the two parties was held on 21 November in Oslo, but no deal was made. In December, negotiations between Eriksson and the Football Federation of Ukraine, who had offered him the position of head coach of the Ukraine national team, did not bear fruit.

On 15 January 2013, it was announced that Eriksson would be joining German 2. Bundesliga side 1860 Munich as assistant to Alexander Schmidt. On 18 January 2013, the club however reported, that Eriksson declined the offer to join 1860.

On 21 January 2013, Eriksson became technical director of Dubai-based club Al Nasr SC in the UAE Arabian Gulf League.

China

On 4 June 2013, Guangzhou R&F of the Chinese Super League announced Eriksson as their new head coach, on a nineteen-month contract lasting until December 2014. He was believed to be paid around £2 million a year for the job. He came up against former Italy manager Marcello Lippi in the city's derby matches, as the World Cup winner was manager of local rival Guangzhou Evergrande. Under Eriksson, Guangzhou R&F finished third in the league in 2014, and therefore qualified for the AFC Champions League for the first time. He left Guangzhou R&F on 10 November 2014, after a disagreement in negotiations for extending his contract.

Eriksson signed a two-year contract with fellow Chinese Super League side Shanghai SIPG on 18 November 2014. He led Shanghai SIPG to finish runners up in the season of 2015, and qualified for the AFC Champions League for the first time.

Under Eriksson, Shanghai SIPG advanced to the quarter finals in their debut in the AFC Champions League, and secured a seat in the 2017 AFC Champions League by finishing third in the 2016 season. However, Eriksson was criticized by single tactical play and failing to give chances to young talents throughout his term at SIPG. He was replaced by André Villas-Boas on 4 November 2016.

On 5 December 2016, Eriksson became the manager of China League One side Shenzhen, replacing Clarence Seedorf. He won his first six matches of the season of 2017, including five league matches and a FA Cup match. However, Eriksson was sacked on 14 June 2017, following a nine-game run without a win.

Philippines national team
On 27 October 2018, Eriksson returned to international football after he was appointed head coach of the Philippines national team on a six-month contract. He was recommended to the position by interim coach Scott Cooper, who took over after Terry Butcher's resignation in August; Eriksson and Cooper previously worked together for English club Leicester City.

In October 2018, Eriksson met with the Filipino players during their training camp in Qatar. The 2018 AFF Championship was his first tournament leading the Philippines. With wins over Singapore and Timor-Leste, and draws with Thailand and Indonesia, the Philippines ended second place in Group B. However, Philippines were defeated by eventual champions Vietnam on 4–2 aggregate in the two-legged semi-finals.

Eriksson was then tasked to lead the Philippines in the 2019 AFC Asian Cup—the team's first appearance in the tournament. They lost their first group match 1–0 to South Korea. This was followed by a 3–0 loss to China PR, which was coached by Eriksson's friend Marcello Lippi. Philippines ended their Asian Cup campaign in a 3–1 loss to Kyrgyzstan, where Stephan Schröck's consolation goal was the Philippines' first and only goal in the tournament.

After the Philippines' winless Asian Cup debut, Eriksson ended his tenure as head coach of the national team. However, he would continue to serve as a consultant.

Personal life
Eriksson's autobiography, My Story, was published in November 2013. He married Ann-Christine Pettersson in July 1977. They filed for divorce in 1994. They have two children, son Johan (born in 1979) and daughter Lina (born in 1987).

In May 1998, Nancy Dell'Olio was introduced to Eriksson, and they began a relationship six months later. In 2001, they relocated to London. In the beginning of 2002, Eriksson had an affair with television presenter Ulrika Jonsson, but he returned to Dell'Olio. In August 2004, Eriksson had an affair with secretary Faria Alam. Dell'Olio was upset, but chose to stay with Eriksson. The couple eventually split up in August 2007.

In October 2016, Eriksson announced he was to take legal action against Mazher Mahmood on the basis that the January 2006 News of the World story had cost him the England job.

Managerial statistics

List of seasons
LC = League Cup
SC = Super Cup
UCL = UEFA Champions League (European Cup prior to 1992)
CWC = UEFA Cup Winners' Cup (discontinued 1999)
UC = UEFA Cup (Now UEFA Europa League)
USC = UEFA Super Cup
ACL = AFC Champions League

Honours

Manager
Degerfors IF
Division 3 Västra Svealand: 1978

IFK Göteborg
Allsvenskan: 1982
Svenska Cupen: 1978–79, 1981–82
UEFA Cup: 1981–82

Benfica
Primeira Divisão: 1982–83, 1983–84, 1990–91
Taça de Portugal: 1982–83
Supertaça Cândido de Oliveira: 1989
European Cup runner-up: 1989–90
UEFA Cup runner-up: 1982–83

Roma
Coppa Italia: 1985–86

Sampdoria
Coppa Italia: 1993–94

Lazio
Serie A: 1999–2000
Coppa Italia: 1997–98, 1999–2000
Supercoppa Italiana: 1998, 2000
UEFA Cup Winners' Cup: 1998–99
UEFA Super Cup: 1999
UEFA Cup runner-up: 1997–98

Individual
Serie A Coach of the Year: 1999–2000
BBC Sports Personality of the Year Coach Award: 2001
Premier League Manager of the Month: August 2007

References
General

Specific

External links

 

1948 births
Living people
Swedish people of Finnish descent
People from Sunne Municipality
Örebro University alumni
Swedish footballers
Association football defenders
Västra Frölunda IF players
Swedish football managers
Degerfors IF managers
IFK Göteborg managers
S.L. Benfica managers
A.S. Roma managers
ACF Fiorentina managers
U.C. Sampdoria managers
S.S. Lazio managers
England national football team managers
Manchester City F.C. managers
Mexico national football team managers
Notts County F.C. non-playing staff
Ivory Coast national football team managers
Leicester City F.C. managers
Guangzhou City F.C. managers
Shanghai Port F.C. managers
Shenzhen F.C. managers
Philippines national football team managers
Swedish expatriate football managers
Swedish expatriate sportspeople in Portugal
Swedish expatriate sportspeople in Italy
Swedish expatriate sportspeople in England
Swedish expatriate sportspeople in Mexico
Swedish expatriate sportspeople in Ivory Coast
Swedish expatriate sportspeople in China
Swedish expatriate sportspeople in the Philippines
Expatriate football managers in Portugal
Expatriate football managers in Italy
Expatriate football managers in England
Expatriate football managers in Mexico
Expatriate football managers in Ivory Coast
Expatriate football managers in China
Expatriate football managers in the Philippines
Primeira Liga managers
Serie A managers
Premier League managers
English Football League managers
Chinese Super League managers
China League One managers
UEFA Cup winning managers
2002 FIFA World Cup managers
UEFA Euro 2004 managers
2006 FIFA World Cup managers
2010 FIFA World Cup managers
2019 AFC Asian Cup managers
Swedish autobiographers
20th-century Swedish people
21st-century Swedish people